Nina Nin-Yuen Wang (born 1972) is an American lawyer serving as a United States district judge of the United States District Court for the District of Colorado. She previously served as a United States magistrate judge of the same court.

Early life and education 

Wang is an immigrant from Taiwan. She earned a Bachelor of Arts from the Washington University in St. Louis in 1994 and a Juris Doctor from Harvard Law School in 1997.

Career 

Wang began her career as an associate at Fried, Frank, Harris, Shriver & Jacobson. From 1999 to 2000, Wang served as a law clerk for Judge Peter J. Messitte of the United States District Court for the District of Maryland. From 2000 to 2004, she served as an Assistant United States Attorney in the United States Attorney's Office for the District of Colorado. She was an associate at Faegre Drinker from 2004 to 2008 and partner until 2015.  In private practivce, Wang focused on copyright and intellectual property law. 

Wang cofounded the Colorado Pro Bono Patent Initiative. She also previously served as president of the Asian Pacific American Bar Association of Colorado.

Federal judicial service 

Wang served as a magistrate judge of the United States District Court for the District of Colorado from February 9, 2015 until July 22, 2022.

On January 19, 2022, President Joe Biden nominated Wang to serve as a United States district judge of the United States District Court for the District of Colorado. President Biden nominated Wang to the seat being vacated by Judge Christine Arguello, who assumed senior status on July 15, 2022. On May 25, 2022, a hearing on her nomination was held before the Senate Judiciary Committee. On June 16, 2022, her nomination was reported out of committee by a 14–8 vote. On July 18, 2022, the United States Senate invoked cloture on her nomination by a 52–33 vote. On July 19, 2022, her nomination was confirmed by a 58–36 vote. She received her judicial commission on July 22, 2022.

See also 
List of Asian American jurists

References

External links 
 

1972 births
Living people
20th-century American lawyers
21st-century American judges
21st-century American lawyers
21st-century American women judges
Assistant United States Attorneys
Colorado lawyers
Harvard Law School alumni
Judges of the United States District Court for the District of Colorado
People from Taipei
Taiwanese emigrants to the United States
United States district court judges appointed by Joe Biden
United States magistrate judges
Washington University in St. Louis alumni